Alfredo Cuentas (born 20 October 1955) is a Mexican sports shooter. He competed in the mixed trap event at the 1988 Summer Olympics.

References

1955 births
Living people
Mexican male sport shooters
Olympic shooters of Mexico
Shooters at the 1988 Summer Olympics
Place of birth missing (living people)
20th-century Mexican people